Ivan Jolić (born 18 May 1980 in Livno, SR Bosnia and Herzegovina, SFR Yugoslavia) is a Bosnian Croatian retired football striker.

Club career

NK Troglav Livno
Jolic started playing football in his hometown in Livno NK Troglav, where he played in all young categories, for the first team he played when he was 17.

NK Široki Brijeg
After FC Troglav, he went in one of the best organized Bosnian and Herzegovinian clubs, NK Siroki Brijeg, where he played one season, attending to return to the parent club. Professional game for FC Troglav moved him to Croatian club NK Varteks where he signed contract for four years.

NK Varteks
Jolic played for NK Varteks from 2002 till 2006. In this period, he played in two semi-finals and two Croatian Cup finals, but club didn't win the title. In that period, Varteks was a constant participant in UEFA competitions. In the 2005-2006 season, Jolic scored 11 goals and, with Leon Benko, was one of the best league tandems. According to good performances and references, he was transferred to Israeli club Hapoel Tel Aviv.

Hapoel Tel Aviv
In May 2006, Jolić signed a two-year contract with Hapoel Tel Aviv. In that season, Hapoel played for the European League and, in the qualifying round, the club launched off Domzale Slovenia and Ukraine's Odessa. This placed it in the group with Paris Saint-Germain Panathainakos, Rapid Bucharest, and Young Boleslav. Hapoel took second place and reached the 1 / 16 finals of the UEFA Cup where he was eliminated by Rangers F.C. In this season, Jolic won the Israel State Cup with Hapoel.

NK Interblock Ljubljana
After a season in Israel and conquered Cup, Jolić signed a contract for the ambitious club FC Interblock Ljubljana. In the two years spent in Ljubljana, Jolić won two Cups and one Supercup with NK Interblock Ljubljana. In the 2008-2009 season, the first match was played against FC Zeta. In that match, Jolić scored the first European goal in history for Interblock.

KS Skenderbeu Korce
In August 2010, Jolić signed for the Albanian football club KS Skenderbeu Korce. In that season, Jolić won the title for Albania with SC Skenderbeu, which was its first title since 1933.

FC Anagennisi Dherynia
In August 2011, Jolić signed for the Cypriot football club FC Anagennisi Dherynia.

NK Zadar
In July 2012, Jolić signed for the Croatian football club NK Zadar.

International career
Jolić also played for the U-21 and A team of Bosnia and Herzegovina. He made his senior debut for Bosnia and Herzegovina in an August 2006 friendly match against France in Sarajevo, coming in as a late substitute for Zvjezdan Misimović. It remained his sole international appearance.

Honours
Hapoel Tel Aviv - Israel State Cup winner 2007
NK Interblock Ljubljana - Slovenian State Cup 2008-2009, Slovenian Supercup 2008
KS Skenderbeu Korce - Albanian Superliga Winner 2011

References

External links
 Player profile - PrvaLiga
 Profile & Statistics at One.co.il 
 
 ivanjolic.com  - Ivan Jolic Official Web Site
 Youtube - Ivan Jolic Goals

1980 births
Living people
Sportspeople from Livno
Association football forwards
Bosnia and Herzegovina footballers
Bosnia and Herzegovina international footballers
NK Troglav 1918 Livno players
NK Varaždin players
Hapoel Tel Aviv F.C. players
NK IB 1975 Ljubljana players
KF Skënderbeu Korçë players
Anagennisi Deryneia FC players
NK Zadar players
NK Solin players
Premier League of Bosnia and Herzegovina players
Croatian Football League players
Israeli Premier League players
Slovenian PrvaLiga players
Kategoria Superiore players
Cypriot First Division players
First Football League (Croatia) players
Bosnia and Herzegovina expatriate footballers
Expatriate footballers in Croatia
Expatriate footballers in Israel
Expatriate footballers in Slovenia
Expatriate footballers in Cyprus
Expatriate footballers in Albania
Bosnia and Herzegovina expatriate sportspeople in Croatia
Bosnia and Herzegovina expatriate sportspeople in Israel
Bosnia and Herzegovina expatriate sportspeople in Slovenia
Bosnia and Herzegovina expatriate sportspeople in Cyprus
Bosnia and Herzegovina expatriate sportspeople in Albania